Chattahoochee High School (colloquially referred to as "Hooch") is a public high school in Johns Creek, Georgia, United States, within the Fulton County School System. It is located next to its only feeder school, Taylor Road Middle School.

It has been recognized by the U.S. Department of Education as one of America's Blue Ribbon Schools.  Chattahoochee was named the 6th Best Public High School in Georgia by Niche. In 2019, it was named a National PTSA School of Excellence and ranked as a top high school in U.S. World & News Report (#282 Nationally, #9 in Georgia).  It was given a rating of 9 out of a possible 10 by Great Schools Rating.

History
The High School opened in the 1991–92 school year replacing the now-closed Crestwood High School. In 1992, the first time a cougar appeared, which was the mascot of the school. 1993 saw enrollment rise to 2200 due to the rapidly growing Alpharetta area. The football stadium opened on September 17, 1993. The following year, the school population continued to increase to 2460. The auditorium and CT Halls were built to attempt to keep up with population growth. In 1995, increased enrollment (2600) forced it to go with a split day, starting freshmen (9 AM) two hours after upperclassmen (7 AM) which would continue for the next two years. Administration added a minute to the bell schedule and parking became a senior only privilege. This continued to increase, forcing the addition of 14 trailers in 1996 to accommodate the students in a school designed for 1800.  The opening of Centennial High School in 1997 reduced student population by 600 students in 1997–98 to 2200. The number of students would continue to fluctuate between 2005 (2004-2005 school year) and 2814 (2001-2002) as the rapidly growing Johns Creek area was fueling student growth and the Fulton County School System was building schools to relieve the overcrowding such as Northview (2002), Alpharetta (2004), and Johns Creek (2009).

Athletics

Since the 2012–13 school year, Chattahoochee High School has competed in Region 6–AAAAAA. From 2010 to 2012 Chattahoochee was in Region 7–AAAA due to redistricting and a decrease in the school's population after the opening of Johns Creek High School in 2009. However, the school moved back up to the highest classification after statewide reclassification.  Chattahoochee was previously a member of Region 7–AAAAA.

Competitive sports at Chattahoochee include baseball, basketball, cheerleading, cross country, football, gymnastics, lacrosse, soccer, golf, tennis, track, volleyball, and wrestling.

Baseball
The 2004-05 Cougars won the state championship
Tim Lemons, Chattahoochee's head varsity baseball coach since the school opened in 1991, was inducted into the GADC Hall of Fame Jan. 13, 2017

Soccer
Boys' Soccer Region Champions: 2015-2017
Boys' Soccer State Champions: 2011, 2017-2018

Girls lacrosse
The girl's lacrosse team won their first state championship in 2009. The Lady Cougars defeated four-time defending state champions, the Milton Eagles, to take home the title. They won with a score of 9 to 7.

Boys' lacrosse
The boys' lacrosse team finished ranked first in the state in 2003 despite losing in the state championship game to Westminster 11–9.

Cheerleading
The competitive cheerleading team won the State Championship in 2000, 2001, 2003, and 2005.

Football

The Chattahoochee High School football team had its first season in 1991, competing in Region 6-Division AAAA, the highest classification at the time. The team ended the season with a respectable record of 3-7 for their first year of varsity football.

In the 2008 season, the Cougars were moved to the much more competitive Region 7-AAAAA where they played mostly Gwinnett County schools that were much bigger than them as opposed to the smaller Fulton County teams. For the 2010 season, the Cougars were moved down to AAAA since the opening of Johns Creek High School pulled many students away from Chattahoochee. The Cougars met the undefeated Starr's Mill Panthers at the Georgia Dome for the state championship. Chattahoochee won 24–0, finishing off a perfect 15–0 season and their first state title. The Cougars were nationally ranked.

Swimming
The girls' swim team won the GA High School State Championship in 1993, 1995, 1996 and 2000. The boys' swim team won the GA High School State Championship in 1996.

Tennis
1998: Girls' team won the 1998 AAAA State Championship, posting an undefeated record while being ranked 11th nationally at one point.
1999: Girls win 3rd State Championship in a row while being ranked 2nd nationally.
2004: Boys win State Championship

Music

Chattahoochee has a band program which is currently directed by Nick Garofalo and assisted by Matthew Crisman.
Chattahoochee has one jazz band, three concert bands, an indoor percussion ensemble, and a marching band. The Cougar Marching Band returned to Annapolis in 2010 for their third consecutive national competition, and most recently performed in USSBA Nationals 2013 in Met Life Stadium, coming first in their class in percussion. Jazz 1, the top jazz band, was invited to perform at the Annual GMEA State Convention on Friday, January 30, 2009, in Savannah, Georgia.
In 1997, the marching band went on a European tour performing in London and Paris.
The Chattahoochee marching band was invited to participate in the 2007 London New Year's Day Parade. The band has also participated in the 2012 New York St. Patrick's Day parade and the 2013 Fiesta Bowl in Phoenix, Arizona. The band was the 2007 USSBA Florida, Georgia, and Tennessee Tri-State champion. The marching band participated in the 2008, 2009, and 2010 USSBA National Championships in Annapolis, Maryland, and the 2013 championship in New Jersey. In 2008, the band took 7th in their class and 3rd overall in the percussion caption. In 2009, the marching band placed 6th in class AAAA. In 2010, the band placed 20th in class AAA. In 2013, the percussion placed first in their division.
In 2019, the marching band participated in the Grand National Championship, hosted by Bands of America. The band reached the semi-finals, placing 38th out of 91 bands.

Orchestra
Chattahoochee has an orchestra program which is currently conducted by Lori Buonamici.

Chorus
Chattahoochee has a chorus program which is currently ran by Jennie Fabianski.

Literary activities

Student Newspaper
The Speculator: Voice and Vision is the school news magazine and news website for Chattahoochee High School. The Speculator originally began at Crestwood High School in 1974, and moved to Chattahoochee when the school opened in 1991. The Speculator was a monthly newspaper up until the 2010–2011 school year, when the staff decided to switch to a news magazine layout, allowing more incorporation of graphics and more involvement with the school's Imaginarium graphic design department. In the fall of 2011, the staff and graphics department jointly decided to add the "Voice" ending to the magazine title, to represent to magazine as the voice of the students. The Speculator: Voice is released five times a year. The Speculator: Vision is the news website version of the Speculator: Voice and was launched during the 2011–2012 school year.

Yearbook
The yearbook at Chattahoohee is called the Current and has published every year since its opening in 1991.

Extracurricular activities
CHS offers over 80 clubs. Notable clubs are the debate team (which has won nine state championships and been a frequent qualifier to the national Tournament of Champions, placing 2nd in 2005), Science Olympiad, Academic Bowl (which has been a constant state champion and national qualifier), Chess Club (which won the 2005 State Championship and runnerup in the 2018), and the Table Top Gaming Club which has won state 10 years in a row.

Alumni Pavilion
The Alumni Pavilion is located at the south end of the Arena. It contains  of covered space and a  viewing deck, and consists of steel beam construction, wood finished columns, and a concrete deck. The pavilion is positioned as an overlook to the Arena and has hosted numerous pre-game activities such as cookouts and booster meetings.

Renovations
The school received numerous renovations from the summer of 2014 until the summer of 2015.

Notable alumni
 Jaron Blossomgame (born 1993), Clemson University men's basketball. NBA basketball player for the Cleveland Cavaliers, basketball player in the Israeli Basketball Premier League
 Clint Boling, University of Georgia football player (2007–2010), drafted by the Cincinnati Bengals in the 4th Round of the 2011 NFL draft, University of Georgia lacrosse player (2005–2008)
 John Busing, former professional football player
 Andi Dorfman, The Bachelorette (season 10)
 Geoff Duncan, Lieutenant Governor of Georgia.
Anthony Fisher (born 1986), basketball player in the Israeli Basketball Premier League
 Jay Litherland, USA Olympic Swim Team
 Sam Park, Georgia state representative, first openly gay and first Asian American Democrat elected to Georgia House of Representatives
 Marcus Sayles, Buffalo Bills.
 Charlie Whitehurst, retired NFL quarterback

References

External links
 http://school.fultonschools.org/hs/chattahoochee/Pages/default.aspx
 https://twitter.com/HoochHappenings

Fulton County School System high schools
Johns Creek, Georgia
Educational institutions established in 1991
1991 establishments in Georgia (U.S. state)